Band of Brothers may refer to:

Military
 Nelson's band of brothers, Lord Nelson's captains at the 1798 Battle of the Nile

Arts and entertainment

Literature
 Band of Brothers (book), a 1992 book by Stephen E. Ambrose, later turned into the miniseries mentioned below
 Band of Brothers, a 1973 aviation adventure novel by Ernest K. Gann
 Band of Brothers, a 2006 nautical war novel in The Bolitho novels series written by Douglas Reeman, under the pseudonym Alexander Kent

Music
 Band of Brothers (Hellyeah album), a 2012 album by American heavy metal group Hellyeah
 Band of Brothers (Willie Nelson album), a 2014 album by American country music artist Willie Nelson
 Band of Brothers (Only Men Aloud! album), a 2009 album by the Welsh choir Only Men Aloud!
 Band of Brothers (Brian Tarquin album), a 2017 album by American guitarist Brian Tarquin

Television
 Band of Brothers (miniseries), a 2001 ten-part World War II television miniseries based on the Stephen E. Ambrose book
 Band of Brothers (reality TV series), a Korean music show

Other uses in arts and entertainment
 "Band of brothers", a notable passage in Shakespeare's St Crispin's Day Speech in Henry V

See also
Brotherhood (disambiguation)
Brothers (disambiguation)
 "The Bonnie Blue Flag", a song also known as "We Are a Band of Brothers"
The Brotherhood (disambiguation)
The Brothers (disambiguation)